Henri Squire (born 27 September 2000) is a German tennis player.

Squire has a career high ATP singles ranking of world No. 287, achieved in August 2022, and has a career-high doubles ranking of world No. 485, attained in November 2022. 

He played two seasons of college tennis for Wake Forest and became 2021 ACC Freshman of the Year and 2021 First-Team all ACC Singles.

Tennis career
Squire made his ATP Tour main draw debut at the 2022 Halle Open as a wild card, where he lost by retirement to Laslo Đere in the first round.

In November 2022, he won his first ATP Challenger Tour doubles title at the Trofeo Faip–Perrel in Bergamo, partnering Jan-Lennard Struff. He has been linked to suspicious actions within tennis matches such as the time when he retired at 6-1 6-7 4-5 0-40 against Coleman Wong on February 27, 2023 in Waco Challenger, USA. It is very unusual activity to see a tennis player retire from the match while the opponent is serving for match and being down 0-40.

ATP Challenger finals

Doubles: 1 (1 title)

Junior Grand Slam finals

Doubles: 1 (1 runner-up)

References

External links
 
 

2000 births
Living people
German male tennis players
Sportspeople from Duisburg
Tennis people from North Rhine-Westphalia
21st-century German people
Wake Forest Demon Deacons men's tennis players